Woodham Golf and Country Club (formerly known as Rushyford Golf Club) is a golf club in Newton Aycliffe, County Durham, England. The club's head professional is Ernie Wilson. Which was in administration but now been bought by Hall Construction Services and is now open.
Woodham Golf Club Honours:

- Lee McCavanagh - Durham County Matchplay Champion 2010, Durham County 30+Caps, England Schoolboys U18s
- Tony Stafford - England University 3 Caps v Wales, Scotland and Ireland, North Durham Union Champion 2002, Durham County U21 Captain, Durham County 8 Caps.
- David Burnham - Durham County 5 Caps

References

External links
Woodham Golf and Country Club Website

Golf clubs and courses in County Durham
1981 establishments in England